Legazpi or Legaspi may refer to:
 Miguel López de Legazpi, Spanish conquistador who founded the first Spanish fort in the Philippines

Places
 Legazpi (Madrid), a ward belonging to the district of Arganzuela
 Legazpi, Gipuzkoa, a town in the Basque Autonomous Community, Spain
 Legazpi, Albay, capital city of the province of Albay, Philippines
 Legaspi, Cagdianao, a barangay in the province of Dinagat Islands, Philippines
 Roman Catholic Diocese of Legazpi, Philippines

Other uses
 Legaspi (surname)
 Jose Borromeo Legaspi Memorial National High School, a public secondary school located in Aklan, Philippines
Legazpi (Madrid Metro), a station on Line 3 and 6